Haddonfield Historic District is located in Haddonfield, Camden County, New Jersey, United States. The district was added to the National Register of Historic Places on July 21, 1982.

See also
National Register of Historic Places listings in Camden County, New Jersey

References

Historic districts in Camden County, New Jersey
Houses on the National Register of Historic Places in New Jersey
Georgian architecture in New Jersey
Federal architecture in New Jersey
Haddonfield, New Jersey
National Register of Historic Places in Camden County, New Jersey
Houses in Camden County, New Jersey
Historic districts on the National Register of Historic Places in New Jersey
New Jersey Register of Historic Places